The 2005 Star World Championships were held in Buenos Aires, Argentina during February 12-18, 2005.

Results

References
 Results

External links
 

Star World Championships
Star World Championships
Sailing competitions in Argentina
 Sports competitions in Buenos Aires